2981 Chagall, provisionally designated , is a Themistian asteroid from the asteroid belt, discovered on 2 March 1981 by American astronomer Schelte Bus at Siding Spring Observatory in New South Wales, Australia.

The asteroid was named after the Russian-French painter Marc Chagall (1887–1985).

References 
 

 Behrend, R. (2005) Observatoire de Geneve web site, http://obswww.unige.ch/~behrend/page_cou.html

External links
 Dictionary of Minor Planet Names, Google books
 
 

002981
Discoveries by Schelte J. Bus
Named minor planets
19810302
Marc Chagall